Church of the Holy Spirit is a church in Bratislava, Slovakia.

The cornerstone was sanctified by Pope John Paul II. It is an atypical building with an unusual roof, 30m high. It has a circular shape and consists of church and pastoral sections. The church was designed by architects Ľudovít Režucha and Marián Lupták. Instead of an altar picture on the wall, there is a metal sculpture of the Holy Spirit depicted as a dove, by Monsignor Ladislav Jurovatý. The church section has capacity of roughly 600 visitors.

External links 
 Rímskokatolícka farnosť Bratislava - Dúbravka 
 3D Model Kostola 

Roman Catholic churches in Slovakia
Roman Catholic churches in Bratislava